Burris Fork is a stream in Moniteau and 
Morgan counties in the U.S. state of Missouri. It is a tributary of North Moreau Creek.

Burris Fork has the name of the local Burris family, the original owners of the site.

References

Rivers of Moniteau County, Missouri
Rivers of Morgan County, Missouri
Rivers of Missouri